Alamgir Hossain is a Jatiya Party (Ershad) politician and the former Member of Parliament of Kishoreganj-3.

Career
Hossain was elected to parliament from Kishoreganj-3 as a Jatiya Party candidate in 1988. He was known as the "architect of Kishorganj" for turning it into a city. His legacy was carried on by his son shafiqul alam shiplu who also worked to develop Kishorganj City.

References

Jatiya Party politicians
4th Jatiya Sangsad members